Xavier Ziani (25 October 1972 – 4 December 2021) was a French professional volleyball player. He played as a middle blocker.

Awards
Pro A Final Four with Tourcoing Lille Métropole Volley-Ball (2003)
Champion of Pro A with Paris Volley (2006)
3rd Place in the 2006 Champions League with Paris Volley (2006)

References

1972 births
2021 deaths
People from Saint-Maurice, Val-de-Marne
French men's volleyball players
Sportspeople from Val-de-Marne